Laze may refer to:

Science
Laze (geology), derived from "lava and haze", a mixture of particles released by a volcanic eruption

Music
Laze (band), a band who performed the song Steppin' Out, remixed by Neo & Farina

Places

Bosnia and Herzegovina
Laze, Bosnia and Herzegovina, a settlement in the Municipality of Rogatica

Slovenia
Gornje Laze, a settlement in the Municipality of Semič
Gradiške Laze, a settlement in the Municipality of Šmartno pri Litiji
Jablaniške Laze, a settlement in the Municipality of Šmartni pri Litiji
Laze, Brežice, a settlement in the Municipality of Brežice
Laze, Gorenja Vas–Poljane, a settlement in the Municipality of Gorenja Vas–Poljane
Laze, Logatec, a settlement in the Municipality of Logatec
Laze nad Krko, a settlement in the Municipality of Ivančna Gorica
Laze, Novo Mesto, a settlement in the Municipality of Novo Mesto
Laze pri Borovnici, a settlement in the Municipality of Borovnica
Laze pri Boštanju, a settlement in the Municipality of Sevnica
Laze pri Dolskem, a settlement in the Municipality of Dol pri Ljubljani
Laze pri Domžalah, a settlement in the Municipality of Domžale
Laze pri Dramljah, a settlement in the Municipality of Šentjur
Laze pri Gobniku, a settlement in the Municipality of Litija
Laze pri Gorenjem Jezeru, a settlement in the Municipality of Cerknica
Laze pri Kostelu, a settlement in the Municipality of Kostel
Laze pri Oneku, a settlement in the Municipality of Kočevje
Laze pri Predgradu, a settlement in the Municipality of Kočevje
Laze pri Vačah, a settlement in the Municipality of Litija
Laze v Tuhinju, a settlement in the Municipality of Kamnik
Laze, Velenje, a settlement in the Municipality of Velenje
Laze, Velike Lašče, a settlement in the Municipality of Velike Lašče
Spodnje Laze, a settlement in the Municipality of Gorje
Zgornje Laze, a settlement in the Municipality of Gorje

See also 
 Laz people or Lazes, an ethnic group native to the eastern Black Sea coast of Turkey